Sands Storm is a 1958 album by American singer Tommy Sands.

Reception

The initial Billboard magazine review from October 20, 1958 commented that "Sands has quite a varied program here...The lad puts a lot of heart and feeling into his renditions".

Track listing
 "Maybellene"
 "Hearts of Stone"
 "Since I Met You, Baby"
 "Oop Shoop"
 "Warm Your Heart"
 "Hey, Miss Fannie"
 "Tweedle Dee"
 "Such a Night"
 "Honey Love"
 "Blue Velvet"
 "Little Mama"
 "Chicken and the Hawk"

Personnel
Tommy Sands – vocals

References

External links
 

1958 albums
Capitol Records albums
Tommy Sands (American singer) albums